Yaqoub Yousif (Arabic:يعقوب يوسف) (born 12 September 1997) is an Emirati footballer. He currently plays as a forward for Emirates Club.

Career
Yaqoub Yousif started his career at Emirates Club and is a product of the Emirates Club's youth system. On 13 December 2018, Yaqoub Yousif made his professional debut for Emirates Club against Al-Sharjah in the Pro League . landed again with Emirates Club from the UAE Pro League to the UAE First Division League in 2018-19 season.

References

External links
 

1997 births
Living people
Emirati footballers
Emirates Club players
UAE Pro League players
UAE First Division League players
Association football forwards
Place of birth missing (living people)